Cardon may refer to:

 Cardon (surname)
 CarDon & Associates, operator of senior housing facilities
 Cardon cactus, a list of cacti
 Cardon V. Burnham (1927–2005), American composer, arranger, conductor, and performer
 a subdivision of C. A. Rosetti, Tulcea, Romania

See also
 Cardón (disambiguation)
 Cardoon, an artichoke of the sunflower family